Qarquluq-e Olya (also Romanized as Qārqūlūq-e ‘Olyā; also known as Ghar Gholoon Olya, Karghuluk, Kārqālāk Bālā, Qārqālūq Bālā, Qārqālūq-e Bālā, Qārqālūq-e ‘Olyā, Qārqoloq Bālā, and Qārqūlūq-e Bālā) is a village in Zangebar Rural District, in the Central District of Poldasht County, West Azerbaijan Province, Iran. At the 2006 census, its population was 258, in 65 families.

References 

Populated places in Poldasht County